Ainono Dam is an earthfill dam located in Akita Prefecture in Japan. The dam is used for irrigation. The catchment area of the dam is 37.8 km2. The dam impounds about 30  ha of land when full and can store 3568 thousand cubic meters of water. The construction of the dam was and completed in 1961.

References

Dams in Akita Prefecture
1961 establishments in Japan